The Battle of Mount Qi was a military conflict which took place around Mount Qi (祁山; the mountainous regions around present-day Li County, Gansu) between the states of Cao Wei and Shu Han in 231 during the Three Kingdoms period of China. It was also the most vigorous of the five Shu invasions of Wei, resulting in thousands of deaths on both sides. Although Zhuge Liang was able to make significant achievement in the beginning of the battle, the battle finally concluded with a strategic Wei victory due to the insufficient food supply for the Shu Han army. The insufficient food supply was caused by heavy rain and mistakes made by Li Yan. The Shu regent, Zhuge Liang, spent three years recuperating before launching another invasion on Wei in 234.

Background
In 217, Liu Bei's strategist, Fa Zheng, proposed that Hanzhong Commandery could be used as an operational base to either attack the heartland of Wei or ingest the far-left-hook of Wei's Liang and Yong provinces. Since then, Fa Zheng's plan became a blueprint for Zhuge Liang's campaigns against Wei. Zhuge Liang had attempted to invade the Wei territories via Mount Qi in his first expedition but to no avail; he then changed targets to Chenchang (陳倉; east of present-day Baoji, Shaanxi), a bridgehead fortress guarding the city of Chang'an. However, after a previous failed attempt to capture Chencang, Zhuge Liang switched to another attack route in the west. In early 231, Zhuge Liang assembled troops to conquer Longyou, setting Mount Qi as his immediate target. Before Zhuge Liang marched towards Mount Qi, he sent emissaries to meet the Xianbei and Qiang peoples and incite them to create disturbances in Wei territory. At the same time, he also invented the "wooden oxen and flowing horses", a mechanical device which greatly improved the transportation of supplies.

Battle
The goal of seizing Longyou was not easily achievable, because Wei had prepared for a probable Shu invasion in the region – Jia Si and Wei Ping were stationed at Mount Qi and formed an initial defence for Tianshui Commandery, while Dai Ling and Fei Yao stationed their crack troops in the heartland of Tianshui. Zhuge Liang had sought aid from a Xianbei tribal chief, Kebineng, who went to Beidi Commandery (北地郡; around present-day central Shaanxi) to rally the locals to support the Shu forces. The offensive began with a minor clash at Mount Qi, giving the Wei general Cao Zhen the impression that the attack was a diversion to mask a major offensive through the Qin Mountains aimed at Chang'an. Cao Zhen thus gathered the majority of the defence forces inside Chang'an before Sima Yi came to replace him as the overall commander of Wei's military forces in Yong and Liang provinces. The Wei generals Zhang He, Fei Yao, Dai Ling, and Guo Huai served as Sima Yi's subordinates.

Sima Yi then ordered Dai Ling and Fei Yao to protect Shanggui County (上邽縣; in present-day Tianshui, Gansu) with 4,000 elite troops and set out with the rest of his men westward to relieve the mountainous battlefield. Zhang He advised Sima Yi to send separate forces to Yong and Mei counties as backup, but Sima Yi said, "I believe that the vanguard can hold. General, what you've said is right. If the vanguard cannot hold, we'll split into front and rear. This was how Qing Bu defeated the three armies of Chu."

The Wei army then advanced towards Yumi County (隃麋縣; east of present-day Qianyang County, Shaanxi). When Zhuge Liang heard that the Wei army had arrived, he ordered his troops to harvest the wheat in Shanggui County. Without good coordination, Zhang He defied Sima Yi's order to defend his position; a detachment of the Wei army went to attack the Shu forces but were defeated. After getting the enemy out of the way, Zhuge Liang foraged for the early spring wheat that was available in the vicinity.

Sima Yi's subordinates feared losing the wheat, but Sima Yi said, "Zhuge Liang thinks too much and makes too little decisions. He'll definitely fortify his camp and defences first before coming to harvest the wheat. Two days is sufficient for me (to reach Shanggui County)." He then led his troops and travelled overnight to Shanggui County. Zhuge Liang retreated after seeing Sima Yi's approach. Sima Yi commented, "I'm weary from traveling day and night. This is because I know what militarists covet. Zhuge Liang does not dare to remain near the Wei River. This is easy for me." Initially, the Wei emperor Cao Rui wanted to supply Sima Yi's army with the wheat in Shanggui County and had rejected a proposal to transport grain from Guanzhong to the frontline. However, Zhuge Liang's movements turned out to be quicker than Cao Rui anticipated; only a portion of the wheat produced in Shanggui County was left after the Shu army's harvesting. The Wei general Guo Huai then asserted his influence over local nomadic tribes and forced them to produce food supplies for the Wei army. The Wei army was thus able to gain access to food supplies without assistance from the central government in Luoyang.

After harvesting the wheat from Shanggui County, Zhuge Liang and the Shu forces retreated but encountered a Wei army led by Sima Yi at Hanyang, located to the east of Shanggui County. Sima Yi then ordered his army to get into formation while sending his subordinate Niu Jin to lead a lightly-armed cavalry force to lure the Shu forces to move towards Mount Qi. After the Shu vanguard commander Ma Dai briefly fought with Niu Jin, Zhuge Liang ordered a general retreat towards the eastern side of the Mount Qi ridges, where the Shu army made camp at Lucheng. Using the river as a natural barrier, Zhuge Liang ordered his troops to position on the two hills on either side of Lucheng and pitch "covering camps" near the riverbank to take complete control of the water passage.

Sima Yi's subordinates urged him to attack on numerous occasions, but Sima Yi was hesitant to do so upon seeing Zhuge Liang's arrangement. Nevertheless, faced with intensive criticism and ridicule from both the enemy and subordinates, Sima Yi eventually relented. In May 231, Sima Yi sent an eager Zhang He to attack the Shu southern camp guarded by Wang Ping, while he personally led a frontal assault against Lucheng from the central avenue. Zhuge Liang ordered Wei Yan, Wu Ban, and Gao Xiang to resist the enemy outside Lucheng, where the Wei forces suffered an unexpected and tremendous defeat: 3,000 soldiers were killed, and 5,000 suits of armour and 3,100 sets of hornbeam crossbows were seized by Shu forces. Even though the losses were heavy, Sima Yi still retained a sizable army, which he led back to his camp.

Despite the victory, Zhuge Liang could not press his advantage with a major offensive due to a dwindling food supply. Adverse weather prevented Shu's logistics from delivering matériel on schedule. Li Yan, the Shu general responsible for overseeing the transportation of food supplies to the frontline, falsely claimed that the emperor Liu Shan had ordered a withdrawal. The Book of Jin claimed that Sima Yi launched an attack on Shu garrisons at this juncture and succeeded in capturing the Shu "covering camps". Zhuge Liang abandoned Lucheng and retreated under the cover of night, but Sima Yi pursued him and inflicted roughly 10,000 casualties on the Shu army. This account from the Book of Jin is disputed by historians and is not included in the 11th-century outstanding chronological historical text Zizhi Tongjian.

In any case, according to Records of the Three Kingdoms and Zizhi Tongjian, Zhuge Liang retreated to the Shu because of lack of supply, not defeat, and the Wei forces pursued him. The pursuit did not go completely smoothly for Wei. Sima Yi ordered Zhang He to further pursue the enemy in an attempt to capitalize on their momentum. The Weilüe mentioned that Zhang He refused to obey Sima Yi's order and argued that, according to classical military doctrine, one should refrain from pursuing an enemy force retreating to its home territory. However, Sima Yi refused to listen and forced Zhang He to carry out this order. Indeed, Zhang He fell into an ambush at Mumen Trail (木門道; near present-day Mumen Village, Mudan Town, Qinzhou District, Tianshui, Gansu), where Zhuge Liang had ordered crossbowmen to hide on high ground and fire at approaching enemy forces when they entered a narrow defile. Zhang He died after a stray arrow hit him in the thigh. Unlike Book of Jin records, Wei's army suffered a great deal of damage from Shu's army, which was retreating while chasing after them.

Aftermath
When Zhuge Liang returned to Hanzhong Commandery, he received a letter from Li Yan informing him that the food supply was ready and asking why he had retreated. At the same time, Li Yan sent Liu Shan a memorial which said that "the army feigned retreat in order to lure the enemy to do battle" in the hope that Zhuge Liang would resume the war so his failure to transport rations would go unnoticed. However, Zhuge Liang decided to return to the Shu capital, Chengdu, and show Liu Shan the handwritten letters of Li Yan, so the latter could not deny the fault. At Chengdu, Zhuge Liang asked the emperor to strip Li Yan of all his titles and official posts and exile him to Zitong Commandery.

References

 Chen, Shou. Records of the Three Kingdoms (Sanguozhi).
 Fang, Xuanling. Book of Jin (Jin Shu).
 Pei, Songzhi. Annotations to Records of the Three Kingdoms (Sanguozhi zhu).
 Sima, Guang. Zizhi Tongjian.

231
Mount Qi 231
Military history of Gansu
230s conflicts